The Vishnu Temple in Bandar Abbas, Iran is a historical monument constructed in 1310 AH (1892 AD) during the reign of Mohammad Hassan Khan Sa'd-ol-Malek. The temple is dedicated to Vishnu. 

The temple was built by the Indian community working for the British East India Company. The temple signifies a good commercial relationship between Iranian and Indian merchants during that period.

Architecture
The temple has a central square room which is  covered by a dome. The architecture of the dome is independent of Iranian prototypical architecture. 
The construction is done with coral stone, mortar, mud, and louis chalk. There are some rooms for students. The corridors and some rooms are painted with the image of Krishna.

See also
Hinduism in Iran

References

Hindu temples in Iran
Vishnu temples